Plantersville is an unincorporated community in Georgetown County, South Carolina, United States. The community is six miles north of Georgetown on U.S. Route 701. Plantersville is home to many plantations and rice fields. Plantersville Elementary School is also located within the community.

Prince Frederick's Chapel Ruins, Summer Chapel Rectory, Prince Frederick's Episcopal Church, and Summer Chapel, Prince Frederick's Episcopal Church are listed on the National Register of Historic Places.

External References 
Gullah Geechee: Descendants of slaves fight for their land http://www.bbc.co.uk/news/magazine-37994938

References

External links
City-Data.com

Unincorporated communities in South Carolina
Unincorporated communities in Georgetown County, South Carolina